The Primera Catalana is the 6th tier of the Spanish football league system and the highest league in the autonomous community of Catalonia. The league was formed in 1991 to replace Regional Preferent as the first level of Catalonia and was split into 2 groups in 2011. Primera Catalana is one of 19 regional premier leagues in Spanish football.

Structure 
The league comprises 48 teams (3 groups of 16 teams). Over the course of a season, which runs annually from September to the following June, each team plays twice against the others in the league, once at 'home' and once 'away', resulting in each team competing in 30 games in total. Three points are awarded for a win, one for a draw and zero for a loss. The teams are ranked in the league table by points gained. In the event that two or more teams finish the season equal in all these respects, teams are separated by head-to-head points, then head-to-head goal difference, then head-to-head goals scored, then goal difference and then goals scored.

From the 2022-23 season at the end of the season, the top team in each group is promoted to the Tercera Federación (Group 5). The teams placed between second and fifth places, and the winning club of a game between the two best sixth places will be promoted to the Superlliga Catalana, a new league that will be played from the 2023–24 season and that will be located between Primera Catalana and Tercera Federación. The teams located between seventh and fourteenth place and the sixth place losers of the play-off will continue in the Primera Catalana, which will become the seventh tier of Spanish professional football. The last classified of each group and the two worst penultimate places will be relegated to Segona Catalana.

Clubs 
A total of 141 clubs have played in the Primera Catalana from its inception in 1991 up to and including the 2021–22 season. UDA Gramenet B is the club that played the most seasons in the category, with a total of 18 campaigns.

The following 48 clubs are competing in the Primera Catalana during the 2022–23 season.

Group 1

Group 2

Group 3

Champions 
This section lists the past champions of the Primera Catalana.

Notes
p: Promoted

References

 
Catalan football competitions
Spain